The 1991 Florida Gators football team represented the University of Florida during the 1991 NCAA Division I-A football season. The season was Steve Spurrier's second as the head coach of the Florida Gators football team.  The Gators were led by quarterback Shane Matthews and first-team All-American defensive tackle Brad Culpepper.

Spurrier's 1991 Florida Gators compiled the first-ever ten-win season in program history, an overall record of 10–2 and a perfect SEC record of 7–0.

Schedule

Primary source: 2015 Florida Gators Football Media Guide.

Roster

Rankings

Game summaries

San Jose State

The season opened with a 59–21   victory over the San Jose State Spartans.

Alabama
The Gators defeated Alabama, 35–0. Spurrier treasured the wins against the Crimson Tide: "Those victories early – '90, '91 – really got us started there at Florida ..."

Syracuse
The 1991 season also included a disappointing 38–21 road loss to the seventeenth-ranked Syracuse Orangemen in the Carrier Dome.

Mississippi State
The Gators had a dominating confidence win over the twenty-first-ranked Mississippi State Bulldogs, 29–7.

LSU
Florida blanked the  LSU Tigers 16–0.

Tennessee

    
         
  
  

    
    

The Gators defeated the fourth-ranked Tennessee Volunteers 35–18.

Northern Illinois
Florida beat Northern Illinois 41–10  .

Auburn
The Auburn Tigers fell to Florida 31–10.

Georgia

    
         
  
  

    
    

The Gators defeated rival and twenty-third-ranked Georgia Bulldogs 45–13.

Kentucky
Florida clinched its first SEC title with a hard-fought win over the Kentucky Wildcats, 35–26. "The Gators appeared on their way to a comfortable victory with a 28-6 lead in the third quarter. That's when the UF band started playing the song "Pour Some Sugar on Me" by Def Leppard and students began throwing little sugar packets into the air. Then UK quarterback Pookie Jones went wild, almost spoiling the party. "

Florida State

Among the Gators' 1991 victories, the 14–9 defensive upset of the Florida State Seminoles was a particularly memorable victory played in front of a record home crowd  (the previous record set only five weeks earlier vs. Tennessee).  The Gators scored touchdowns on a first-quarter run by tailback Errict Rhett, and a 72-yard bomb from Shane Matthews to wide receiver Harrison Houston in the third quarter, and held on to win.  Gators defensive ends Darren Mickell and Harvey Thomas kept Seminoles quarterback Casey Weldon off balance and on the run in the second half, and, in the fourth quarter, Gators safeties Will White and Del Speer combined to break up a fourth-down pass to the end zone by Weldon with two minutes remaining§, thus saving the victory for Florida.

Sugar Bowl

Postseason
The Gators closed out their season with their first New Year's Day bowl appearance since 1974, a 28–39 defeat by the Notre Dame Fighting Irish in the Sugar Bowl, and were ranked seventh in the final Associated Press Poll. Florida won the team's first official SEC championship, 59 seasons after joining the conference as a charter member. Quarterback Shane Matthews repeated as SEC Player of the Year in 1991.

References

Florida
Florida Gators football seasons
Southeastern Conference football champion seasons
Florida Gators football